Caplinger Mills Historic District is a national historic district located at Caplinger Mills, Cedar County, Missouri. The district includes one contributing site and three contributing structure related to the development and use of water power in Cedar County. It developed between about 1895 and 1943, and includes a grist mill site, dam, power house and double span Pratt with two pony truss approach spans bridge (1895).

It was listed on the National Register of Historic Places in 1993.

References

External links

Historic districts on the National Register of Historic Places in Missouri
Buildings and structures in Cedar County, Missouri
National Register of Historic Places in Cedar County, Missouri